This list of oil fields includes some major oil fields of the past and present.

The list is incomplete; there are more than 25,000 oil and gas fields of all sizes in the world. However, 94% of known oil is concentrated in fewer than 1500 giant and major fields. Most of the world's largest oilfields are located in the Middle East, but there are also supergiant (>10 billion bbls) oilfields in Brazil, Mexico, Venezuela, Kazakhstan, and Russia.

Amounts listed below, in billions of barrels, are the estimated ultimate recoverable petroleum resources (proved reserves plus cumulative production), given historical production and current extraction technology. Oil shale reserves (perhaps ) and coal reserves, both of which can be converted to liquid petroleum, are not included in this chart. Other non-conventional liquid fuel sources are similarly excluded from this list.

Oil fields greater than

See also 

Athabasca Oil Sands
Giant oil and gas fields
List of coalfields
List of natural gas fields
List of oil and gas fields of the North Sea
OAPEC
Oil megaprojects
Oil shale reserves
OPEC
Petrol
Petroleum Reservoir

References 

Geology-related lists

Peak oil